or  is a lake in the municipality of Snåsa in Trøndelag county, Norway. The Blåfjella–Skjækerfjella National Park borders the  lake to the south and east.

See also
List of lakes in Norway

References

Snåsa
Lakes of Trøndelag